Arica is a city in northern Chile.

Arica may also refer to:


Places
 Arica y Parinacota Region, Chile
 Arica Province, Chile
 Arica, Amazonas, Colombia
 Puerto Arica, Colombia
 Arica Province (Peru)
 Arıca, Gercüş, Turkey
 Arıca, Vezirköprü, Turkey

Other uses
 Arica (Martian crater)
 Arica (moth)
 Arica Airport (ACM), Arica, Chile
 Arica School, a group founded by Bolivian-born philosopher Oscar Ichazo, 1968
 BAP Arica (SS-36), Peruvian submarine
 Battle of Arica, War of the Pacific, 1880

See also
 Arıca (disambiguation)